Orbisongs is a compilation LP released by Monument Records in 1965 after Roy Orbison had left the label and joined MGM. It features tracks such as the stereo version of "Oh, Pretty Woman", a different version of "Dance", and the unreleased "I Get So Sentimental."

Cash Box described the single "(Say) You're My Girl" as an "easy-going, pledge of romantic devotion with an infectious repeating rhythmic riff."

Track listing

References

Roy Orbison albums
1965 albums
Albums produced by Fred Foster
Monument Records albums